Malaysia competed at the 1984 Summer Olympics in Los Angeles, United States.  The nation returned to the Olympic Games after participating in the American-led boycott of the 1980 Summer Olympics. Twenty-one competitors, twenty men and one woman, took part in twelve events in five sports.

Athletics

Men
Track events

Cycling

One cyclist represented Malaysia in 1984.

Track
Sprint

Time trial

Hockey

Men's tournament

Team roster

 Ahmed Fadzil
 Yahya Atan
 Foo Keat Seong
 Sukhvinderjeet Singh Kulwant
 Michael Chew
 Sarjit Singh
 Stephen van Huizen
 Jagjit Singh Chet
 Soon Mustafa Karim
 Kevin Nunis
 Ow Soon Kooi
 Tam Chew Seng
 Shurentheran Murugesan
 Poon Fook Loke
 Colin Santa Maria
 Zulkifli Abbas

Group A

 Qualified for semifinals

Ninth place qualifiers

Eleventh and twelfth place match

Ranked 11th in final standings

Shooting

Men

Swimming

Women

References

External links
 Official Olympic Reports

Nations at the 1984 Summer Olympics
1984